is a prefecture of Japan located in the Chūgoku region of Honshu. Shimane Prefecture is the second-least populous prefecture of Japan at 665,205 (February 1, 2021) and has a geographic area of 6,708.26 km2. Shimane Prefecture borders Yamaguchi Prefecture to the southwest, Hiroshima Prefecture to the south, and Tottori Prefecture to the east.

Matsue is the capital and largest city of Shimane Prefecture, with other major cities including Izumo, Hamada, and Masuda. Shimane Prefecture contains the majority of the Lake Shinji-Nakaumi metropolitan area centered on Matsue, and with a population of approximately 600,000 is Japan's third-largest metropolitan area on the Sea of Japan coast after Niigata and Greater Kanazawa. Shimane Prefecture is bounded by the Sea of Japan coastline on the north, where two-thirds of the population live, and the Chūgoku Mountains on the south. Shimane Prefecture governs the Oki Islands in the Sea of Japan which juridically includes the disputed Liancourt Rocks (竹島, Takeshima). Shimane Prefecture is home to Izumo-taisha, one of the oldest Shinto shrines in Japan, and the Tokugawa-era Matsue Castle.

History

Early history 

The history of Shimane starts with Japanese mythology. The Shinto god Ōkuninushi was believed to live in Izumo, an old province in Shimane. Izumo Shrine, which is in the city of Izumo, honors the god.　At that time, the current Shimane prefecture was divided into three parts: Iwami, Izumo, and Oki. That lasted until the abolition of the han system took place in 1871. During the Nara period, Kakinomoto no Hitomaro read a poem on Shimane's nature when he was sent as the Royal governor.

Later on in the Kamakura period, Kamakura shogunate forced emperors Go-Toba and Godaigo into exile in Oki. Emperor Go-Daigo later escaped away from Oki and began rallying supporters against the shogunate, which succeeded.

Middle Ages 
During the Muromachi period, Izumo and Oki were controlled by the Kyogoku clan. However, after the Ōnin War, the Amago clan expanded power based in Gassantoda Castle and the Masuda clan dominated Iwami Province. The Iwami Ginzan Silver Mine was located between Amago territory and Masuda territory, so there were many battles between these clans for the silver. However, in 1566 Mōri Motonari conquered Izumo, Iwami, and Oki. After over 30 years of Mori control, in 1600 Horio Yoshiharu entered Izumo and Oki as the result of Battle of Sekigahara, which Mori lost. Following the change, Horio Yoshiharu decided to move to build Matsue Castle instead of Gassan-Toda, and soon after Yoshiharu's death the castle was completed. Later in 1638, the grandson of Tokugawa Ieyasu, Matsudaira Naomasa became the ruler because the Horio clan had no heir, and his family ruled until the abolition of the han system.

The Iwami area was split into three regions: the mining district, under the direct control of the Shogunate, the Hamada clan region, and the Tsuwano clan region. The Iwami Ginzan, now a UNESCO World Heritage Site produced silver and was one of the nation's largest silver mine by the early 17th century. The Hamada clan was on the shogunate's side in the Meiji Restoration, and the castle was burned down. The Tsuwano clan, despite then being ruled by the Matsudaira, was on the emperor's side in the restoration.

Modern Age 
In 1871, the abolition of the han system placed the old Shimane and Hamada Provinces in the current area of Shimane Prefecture. Later that year, Oki became part of Tottori. In 1876, Hamada Prefecture was merged into the Shimane Prefecture. Also, Tottori Prefecture was added in the same year. However, five years later, in 1881, the current portion of Tottori Prefecture was separated and the current border was formed.

Geography 
Shimane Prefecture is situated on the Sea of Japan side of the Chūgoku region. Because of its mountainous landscape, rice farming is done mostly in the Izumo plain where the city of Izumo is located. Another major landform is the Shimane peninsula. The peninsula is located across the Sea of Japan from Izumo to Sakaiminato, which is located in Tottori prefecture. Also, the peninsula created two brackish lakes, Lake Shinji and Nakaumi. The island of Daikon is located in Nakaumi. Off the main island of Honshū, the island of Oki belongs to Shimane prefecture as well. The island itself is in the Daisen-Oki National Park. Shimane also claims the use of Liancourt Rocks, over which they are in dispute with South Korea.

As of 1 April 2012, 6% of the total land area of the prefecture was designated as Natural Parks, namely Daisen-Oki National Park; Hiba-Dōgo-Taishaku and Nishi-Chūgoku Sanchi Quasi-National Parks; and eleven Prefectural Natural Parks.

Most major cities are located either on the seaside, or along a river.

Cities

Eight cities are located in Shimane Prefecture, the largest in population being Matsue, the capital, and the smallest being Gōtsu. The cities Masuda, Unnan, Yasugi, and Gōtsu had a slight population increase due to the mergers in the early 2000s.

Towns and villages
These are the towns and villages of each district. The number of towns and villages greatly decreased during the mergers. However, they hold about one-third of the prefecture's population.

Mergers

Climate

The prefecture has a sub-tropical climate. Winter is cloudy with a little snow, and summer is humid. It rains almost every day in the rainy season, from June to mid-July.

Transportation

Airports

Three airports serve Shimane. The Izumo Airport located in Izumo is the largest airport in the prefecture in terms of passengers, which has regular flights to Haneda Airport, Osaka Airport, Fukuoka Airport, and Oki Airport. The Iwami Airport has two flights each day to Haneda and Osaka and 2 arrivals. Oki Airport has scheduled flights to Osaka and Izumo Airports.

 Izumo Airport
 Iwami Airport
 Oki Airport

Rail
JR West and Ichibata Electric Railway serves the prefecture in terms of rail transportation. The Sanin Main Line goes through the prefecture on the Sea of Japan side going into major cities such as Matsue and Izumo.  and  stations are the major stops in the prefecture. The Kisuki line, which forks from Shinji Station on the Sanin Line, connects with the Geibi Line in Hiroshima Prefecture, cutting into the Chūgoku Mountains. Ichibata Electric Railway serve the Shimane peninsula from Dentetsu-Izumoshi Station and Izumo Taisha-mae Station to Matsue Shinjiko-Onsen Station.

JR West has three Limited Express trains to Shimane, which are Super Matsukaze, Super Oki, and Yakumo. Additionally, the overnight limited express Sunrise Izumo operates daily between Tokyo and Izumoshi.

 West Japan Railway Company
 Sanin Main Line
 Sankō Line
 Kisuki Line
 Yamaguchi Line
 Ichibata Electric Railway
 Kita-Matsue Line
 Taisha Line

Roads

General Roads
Japan National Route 9
Izumo Bypass
Gōtsu Road
Japan National Route 54
Japan National Route 180
Japan National Route 184
Japan National Route 186
Japan National Route 187
Japan National Route 191
Japan National Route 261
Japan National Route 314
Japan National Route 375
Japan National Route 431
Japan National Route 432
Japan National Route 485
Japan National Route 488

Highways
The four expressways in the prefecture connect major cities with other prefectures. The Matsue expressway connects Matsue with Unnan and Yonago in Tottori prefecture. Hamada Expressway forks from the Chūgoku Expressway at Kita-Hiroshima and stretches to Hamada.

 Sanin Expressway
 Matsue Expressway
 Hamada Expressway
 Chūgoku Expressway

Ferry/High Speed Boats
 Oki Kisen

Economy 
In Shimane, the largest employer is the retail industry, employing over 60,000 workers. The supermarket, Mishimaya, and the hardware store, Juntendo, are examples of companies based in Shimane. The manufacturing industry has the second number of employees with 49,000 workers.

Companies based in Shimane

Manufacturing
 Izumo Murata Manufacturing
 Shimane Fujitsu
 Mitsubishi Agricultural Machinery

Financial
 The Shimane Bank
 The San-in Godo Bank

Others
 Network Applied Communication Laboratory
 Mishimaya
 Juntendo
 Ichibata Electric Railway

Major factories
 Hitachi Metals

Demographics 

One-third of the prefecture's population is concentrated in the Izumo-Matsue area. Otherwise, over two-thirds of the population is on the coastline. The reason is that the Chūgoku Mountains make the land inland harder to inhabit. The capital, Matsue, has the smallest population out of all the 47 prefectural capitals. Shimane has also the largest percentage of the elderly. The province had an estimated 743 centenarians per million inhabitants in September 2010, the highest ratio in Japan, overtaking Okinawa Prefecture (667 centenarians per million).

Population by age
Total Population in age groups
2007 Estimated Population
Unit: Thousands
Population in age groups by gender
2007 Estimated population
Unit: Thousands

Source：Graph 10/Prefectures Age（In Age groups）, Gender divided population－Total Population(Ministry of Internal Affairs Statistics Bureau)

Culture

Cultural Assets

World Cultural Heritage
 The Historic Remains of Iwami Ginzan Silver Mine and its Cultural Background (Ōda City)

National Treasures
 Izumo-taisha Main Shrine (Izumo City)
 Kamosu Shrine Main Shrine (Matsue City)
 Toiletry case with autumn field and deer design (Izumo-taisha)
 Armour Laced with white thread (Hinomisaki Shrine)
 Bronze bells from the Kamo-Iwakura site Unearthed bronze bell-shaped vessel (Unnan City)
 Kojindani Ruins Unearthed ruins (Izumo City)

Important Traditional Building Preservation Area
 Ōmori (Ōda City)
 Yunotsu (Ōda City)

Languages (Dialects) 
 Unpaku dialect (Izumo dialect, Oki dialect, etc.)
 Iwami dialect

Universities in Shimane Prefecture
 Shimane University, Matsue and Izumo (National university)
 The University of Shimane, Hamada (Prefectural university)

Tourism 
Shimane Vogel Park
Matsue Castle
Adachi Museum of Art
Aquas Aquarium
Iwami Ginzan Silver Mine
Izumo-taisha
Izumo Province
Shimane Art Museum
Iwami Art Museum
Mt. Sanbe
Tamatsukuri Onsen

Prefectural symbols 
The prefectural flower is the mountain peony. On the island of Daikonjima, they were grown from at least the 18th century.

See also 
Lafcadio Hearn

Notes

References
 Nussbaum, Louis-Frédéric and Käthe Roth. (2005).  Japan encyclopedia. Cambridge: Harvard University Press. ;  OCLC 58053128

External links 

 Official homepage of Shimane Prefecture
 National Archives of Japan  ... Shimane map (1891)
 Sightseeing In Shimane

 
Chūgoku region
Prefectures of Japan